Charles Benjamin Clark (August 24, 1844 – September 10, 1891) was a U.S. Representative from Wisconsin and one of the founders of the Kimberly-Clark Corporation in Neenah with John A. Kimberly, Franklyn C. Shattuck, and Havilah Babcock.

Born in Theresa, New York, Clark attended the common schools. He moved to Wisconsin in 1855 with his widowed mother, who settled in Neenah, Wisconsin The Civil War began in 1861 when he was sixteen, and he enlisted in Company I, Twenty-first Regiment, Wisconsin Volunteer Infantry, when it was formed and served with the same unit, rising from private to first sergeant to first lieutenant.

Clark engaged in mercantile pursuits, banking, and the manufacture of paper, notably Clark was a founder of the Kimberly-Clark Corporation in 1872. He served as mayor of Neenah (1880–83), was a member of its city council from 1883 to 1885, and became a member of the Wisconsin State Assembly in 1885.

Clark was elected as a Republican to the Fiftieth and Fifty-first Congresses (March 1887 – March 1891). An unsuccessful candidate for reelection in 1890, he died of Brights Disease the following September at age 47 at Watertown, New York, while on a visit to his old home. Clark was interred in Wisconsin at Oak Hill Cemetery in Neenah.

ThedaCare Regional Medical Center-Neenah, opened  in 1909 as Theda Clark Memorial Hospital, was named for his eldest child. Theda Clark Peters (1871–1903) died after childbirth at home at age 32 and the Clark family established the hospital.

References
https://wpteducation.org/biographies/books/Clark_Level2_fullpage1.pdf

External links

Family letters: A personal selection from Theda Clark's life
Kimberly-Clark – Timeline
Paper Industry International Hall of Fame – Charles Clark

1844 births
1891 deaths
People from Theresa, New York
Politicians from Neenah, Wisconsin
People of Wisconsin in the American Civil War
Mayors of places in Wisconsin
Wisconsin city council members
Republican Party members of the Wisconsin State Assembly
Union Army officers
Kimberly-Clark
Republican Party members of the United States House of Representatives from Wisconsin
19th-century American politicians